KBNA-FM (97.5 MHz "Ké Buena 97.5") is a commercial radio station in El Paso, Texas. The station is owned by Grupo Radio Centro and it airs a Regional Mexican radio format.

KBNA-FM's transmitter is located in the Franklin Mountains, off Scenic Drive in El Paso.  The station has an effective radiated power (ERP) of 100,000 watts horizontal and 48,000 watts vertical.  The signal extends north to Las Cruces, New Mexico, and south through Ciudad Juárez and the Mexican state of Chihuahua.

History

Early Years
On February 16, 1969, KINT-FM first signed on.  It was owned by Sun County Broadcasting, which also owned AM 1590 KINT (today KELP).   The 1970s' version of KINT-FM is not related to the current KINT-FM, heard on 93.9 MHz and owned by Entravision Communications.  While its AM station carried a contemporary hits format, KINT-FM aired progressive rock.

By the mid-1970s, KINT-FM had joined its AM sister station, playing top 40 hits and later adding disco music.  Larry Daniels owned KINT-AM-FM in the early 1970s.  Jim Tabor (former KLIF Dallas DJ) and his father bought the stations in 1974. The studios and the 1590 AM transmitter were at 5300 El Paso Drive. They moved the offices to the 5959 Gateway Building near Bassett Center, and then bought a building at 5710 Trowbridge that became known as Radio Center.

KYSR-FM
Tabor later changed the AM call sign and format in 1979 to KKOL "Kool Oldies".  He sold the AM to Gary Acker in 1981.  97.5 KINT-FM was sold to a new company called Great American broadcasting, Inc., with an AM station on 920 kHz (now KQBU).  In 1982, Great American changed the call letters to KYSR and KYSR-FM.

KYSR-FM moved from contemporary hits to adult contemporary music.  In 1982, the stations changed hands again, going to KYS Radio.

KBNA-FM
In 1985, the two stations were acquired by Tichenor Radio.  Tichenor specialized in Spanish language formats and flipped the stations to Regional Mexican music as KBNA and KBNA-FM or "Ké Buena" ("How Good").  Tichenor stations, including KBNA-AM-FM, were acquired by Univision Communications in 2003.  Univision flipped the AM station to Spanish language talk radio but kept Regional Mexican music playing on KBNA-FM.

In 2016, Univision Radio exited the El Paso media market by selling its stations to an affiliate of Mexican radio broadcaster Grupo Radio Centro for $2 million.  GRC took over operations via a local marketing agreement (LMA) on November 8.  Rafael Márquez, a United States citizen, owns 75 percent of the licensee, under the business name "97.5 Licensee TX, LLC."  The remainder is owned by Grupo Radio Centro TX, LLC, a subsidiary of the Mexican media company.

References

External links

BNA-FM
BNA-FM
Grupo Radio Centro